Instant Mom is an American sitcom produced for the NickMom block on the Nick Jr. channel. It was developed by Howard Michael Gould and stars Tia Mowry as a stepmother of three children alongside her husband.

The series first aired on September 29, 2013, on both Nickelodeon's Nick at Nite block (at 8:30 p.m.) and the NickMom block (at 10:30 p.m.). The debut was the highest-rated premiere in the history of both blocks. On November 22, 2013, the series was renewed for a second season of 20 episodes. It was renewed for a third season on September 9, 2014. Nickelodeon announced on October 21, 2015, that Instant Mom wouldn't extend beyond its third season and would end its run with the 65 episodes produced. The third season premiered first on another ViacomCBS-owned channel, TV Land.

Premise
Set in Philadelphia, Stephanie Phillips is a food blogger and party girl, who has to drastically tone down her lifestyle when she marries Charlie Phillips, an older man with three children. She now has to be a mother to Charlie's teenage daughter, Gabrielle, and his grade school-age sons James and Aaron. Stephanie has to quickly learn how to be a full-time stepmom with the help of her overbearing mother, Maggie, while attempting to keep her social life active.

Episodes

Cast and characters
Stephanie Turner-Phillips (Tia Mowry-Hardrict) is the new step-mom and trying to be the best that she can be. She is a food blogger and a party girl.
Charlie Phillips (Michael Boatman) is Stephanie's older husband who is a doctor and the father of three children by his first wife.
Maggie Turner (Sheryl Lee Ralph) is Stephanie's mom who often butts into her daughter's personal life, usually with the explanation that she's trying to make the inexperienced Stephanie a better mother when there is a family crisis.
Gabrielle "Gabby" Beatrice Phillips (Sydney Park) is the eldest sibling and only daughter of Stephanie and Charlie. She is 15 years old at the start of the series and, like many other teenage girls, she is very fashion-conscious. She is also a very smart honor student. She is seen as the most unimaginably smart, pretty, popular, talented, funny and stylish person ever.
James Phillips (Tylen Jacob Williams) is the middle sibling of Gabby and Aaron. He is known as the trickster of the family, and is frequently pulling pranks on both his siblings and parents. He doesn't admit it, but he is envious of Gabby's superiority and popularity and tries to pull pranks on her, often having them redirected at him.
Aaron Phillips (Damarr Calhoun) is the youngest sibling of Gabby and James. He is seen as the child who acts the cutest among all the family members. When he comes to realize this, he starts trying to use it to his advantage.

Production
On August 3, 2012, Nickelodeon announced that it had green-lit the Instant Mom pilot. Tia Mowry-Hardrict, Duane Martin, Sheryl Lee Ralph, Sydney Park, Tylen Williams, and Damarr Calhoun were cast on November 26, 2012. Michael Boatman would later replace Duane Martin. It was announced on April 3, 2013, that Instant Mom was officially picked up for a 13-episode first season to air on NickMom in late 2013. Later on August 19, 2013, Nickelodeon ordered seven additional episodes bringing the series' first season to 20 episodes. On November 22, 2013, six additional episodes were added first season. Both NickMom and Nick at Nite aired episodes on the same nights until the NickMom block closed on September 28, 2015. Filming took place at Paramount Studios in Hollywood, California. The series aired 65 episodes over three seasons, premiering on September 29, 2013, and ending on December 19, 2015. The series outlasted the NickMom programming block by three months.

Reception

Critical response
Emily Ashby of Common Sense Media gave the show 4 out of 5 stars. Brian Lowry of Variety said the show mirrors Trophy Wife.

Awards and nominations

References

External links

2010s American black sitcoms
2013 American television series debuts
2015 American television series endings
English-language television shows
Nick at Nite original programming
Television series about children
Television series about families
Television series about siblings
Television shows set in Philadelphia
TV Land original programming
Television series by Kapital Entertainment